Gibborissoa virgata is a species of sea snail, a marine gastropod mollusk in the family Litiopidae.

Description

Distribution
This species is distributed in the Mediterranean Sea, the Red Sea and in the Indian Ocean along Madagascar.

References

 Dautzenberg, Ph. (1929). Mollusques testaces marins de Madagascar. Faune des Colonies Francaises, Tome III
 Streftaris, N.; Zenetos, A.; Papathanassiou, E. (2005). Globalisation in marine ecosystems: the story of non-indigenous marine species across European seas. Oceanogr. Mar. Biol. Annu. Rev. 43: 419–453

External links

Litiopidae
Gastropods described in 1849